The Bishop of Menevia is the Ordinary of the Latin Rite Roman Catholic Diocese of Menevia in the Province of Cardiff.

The Diocese of Menevia covers an area of  roughly consisting of Carmarthenshire, Ceredigion, Neath Port Talbot, Pembrokeshire, the City and County of Swansea and the ancient counties of Brecknockshire and Radnorshire. The see is in Swansea, where the seat is located at Saint Joseph's Cathedral.

The Vicariate Apostolic of Wales was elevated to diocese status on 12 May 1898. The present territory of the Diocese dates from the restructuring of the Province of Cardiff by Pope John Paul II on 12 February 1987. The seat of Bishop was vacant following the retirement of Rt. Reverend Thomas Burns, S.M. in July 2019. The Diocese was overseen by the Apostolic Administrator The Most Reverend Archbishop George Stack of the Archdiocese of Cardiff. Following Stack's retirement in 2022, Pope Francis appointed Bishop Mark O’Toole as metropolitan archbishop of Cardiff and bishop of Menevia, Wales, uniting the two sees in persona Episcopi.

The estimated Catholic population of the Diocese is 26,266 out of a total population of 788,550 (3.3%).

List of the bishops of Menevia and its precursor office

Ancient Diocese of Menevia

Vicars Apostolic of Wales

Bishop of Menevia

See also 
Roman Catholicism in England and Wales

References